Maintenay is a commune in the Pas-de-Calais department in the Hauts-de-France region of France.

Geography
Maintenay is situated 9 miles (14 km) south of Montreuil-sur-Mer,  at the junction of the D119 and D139 roads.

Population

Places of interest
 The Château de Bertronval.
 The thirteenth century church of Saint Nicholas.
 The watermill

See also
Communes of the Pas-de-Calais department

References

Communes of Pas-de-Calais